Daniil Anatolyevich Gridnev (born 2 February 1986) is a Russian former professional footballer.

Club career
He made his professional debut in the Russian First Division in 2006 for FC Fakel Voronezh.

He made his Russian Premier League debut for PFC Krylia Sovetov Samara on 27 March 2010 in a game against FC Tom Tomsk.

References

1986 births
Footballers from Voronezh
Living people
Russian footballers
Russia youth international footballers
FC Fakel Voronezh players
FC Anzhi Makhachkala players
PFC Krylia Sovetov Samara players
Russian Premier League players
PFC Spartak Nalchik players
FC Shinnik Yaroslavl players
FC Volgar Astrakhan players
FC Luch Vladivostok players
FC Torpedo Moscow players
Association football midfielders
FC Neftekhimik Nizhnekamsk players
FC SKA Rostov-on-Don players